Antenore Negri (20 November 1898 – 9 February 1970) was an Italian long-distance runner who competed at the 1924 Summer Olympics,

References

External links
 

1898 births
1970 deaths
Athletes from Milan
Athletes (track and field) at the 1924 Summer Olympics
Italian male long-distance runners
Italian male steeplechase runners
Olympic athletes of Italy